Ogles is a surname. Notable people with the surname include:

Andy Ogles, American politician
Benjamin M. Ogles (born 1961), American Mormon leader and university administrator
Brandon Ogles, American politician

See also
Ogle (surname)